Pundibari is a village in the Cooch Behar II CD block in the Cooch Behar Sadar subdivision of the Cooch Behar district of West Bengal, India.

Geography

Location
It is the headquarters of Cooch Behar–II Community Development Block under Cooch Behar Sadar subdivision of the district.

Area overview
The map alongside shows the north-central part of the district. It has the highest level of urbanisation in an overwhelming rural district. 22.08% of the population of the Cooch Behar Sadar subdivision lives in the urban areas and 77.92% lives in the rural areas. The entire district forms the flat alluvial flood plains of mighty rivers.
 
Note: The map alongside presents some of the notable locations in the subdivision. All places marked in the map are linked in the larger full screen map.

Civic administration

Police station
There is a police station at Pundibari.

Transport
The Pundibari railway station is on the New Jalpaiguri–New Bongaigaon section  of the Barauni–Guwahati line.

Education
Uttar Banga Krishi Vishwavidyalaya initially started functioning as a satellite campus of Bidhan Chandra Krishi Vishwavidyalaya and was formally established in 2001.

Healthcare
Pundibari Rural Hospital, with 30 beds at Pundibari, is the major government medical facility in the Cooch Behar II CD block.

References

Cities and towns in Cooch Behar district